Pterasteridae is a family of sea stars in the order Velatida, consisting of eight genera.

Description and characteristics 
Pterasterids are primarily deep-water, and have an inflated aboral surface. Like many other members of the ordo Velatida, they have a hole in the middle of the central disc called "osculum", from which they can expel mucus for defending against predators.

Many species brood their young in an internal chamber flushed with seawater.

Fossil pterasterids have been found as early as the upper Campanian of the Cretaceous period.

Genera
According to the World Register of Marine Species : 
 Amembranaster Golotsvan, 1998 -- 1 species
 Benthaster Sladen, 1882 -- 3 species
 Calyptraster Sladen, 1882 -- 5 species
 Diplopteraster Verrill, 1880 -- 7 species
 Euretaster Fisher, 1940 -- 3 species
 Hymenaster Thomson, 1873 -- 51 species
 Hymenasterides Fisher, 1911 -- 2 species
 Pteraster Müller & Troschel, 1842 -- 46 species

References

External links
 
 

 
Echinoderm families
Extant Campanian first appearances
Taxa named by Edmond Perrier